Rafael (Old Nubian: Ⲣⲁⲫⲁⲏⲗ, Raphael; c. 1002) was a ruler of the Nubian kingdom of Makuria.

Reign
Contemporary writers, such as Abu al-Makarim in a work attributed to Abu Salih the Armenian, record that he constructed a palace with several domes built of red brick in the capital city, Old Dongola, around 1002, which excavations have yet to identify.

References

Nubian people
Kingdom of Makuria
11th-century monarchs in Africa